The 1915 season was the fourth season for Santos Futebol Clube, a Brazilian football club, based in the Vila Belmiro bairro, Zona Intermediária, Santos, Brazil.

References

External links
Official Site 

Santos
1915
1915 in Brazilian football